The Prost AP04 was the car with which the Prost team competed in the 2001 Formula One World Championship. The car was powered by the engine from the previous year's Ferrari car – badged as an Acer in deference to the team's new title sponsor – and ran on Michelin tyres. Over the course of the season the car was raced by five drivers: French veteran Jean Alesi, Argentine Gastón Mazzacane, Brazilian Luciano Burti, German Heinz-Harald Frentzen and Czech Tomáš Enge.

Background and design 
For Prost, 2001 was a season of struggle as Alain Prost tried to keep the team going. Initially, things looked quite promising after the catastrophic  season, with the Diniz family becoming shareholders and bringing Parmalat sponsorship to the team. The AP04 also used a customer 2000-spec Ferrari engine and transmission, although the former was badged as an Acer in deference to the team's title sponsor. Prost was also one of several teams to opt for the new Michelin tyres on the French company's return to the sport. Alesi set fast times in winter testing, and the car appeared to show capable speed.

Racing history 
However, the team were mired in the midfield once the season began, fueling the speculation that the team had run an illegally fast car via running the car underweight during testing in an attempt to attract sponsors. However, the cars were much more reliable than the previous year's disastrous AP03, Alesi finishing all 12 races he had with the team (though being classified at the end, Alesi physically did not finish the European GP 2001, as he spun off trying to overtake Kimi Räikkönen on lap 64. But that was enough to be classified, though three laps down on the winner). In the process he scored four precious points but fell out of favour with team principal Alain Prost and left the team for Jordan after the German GP to replace the sacked Heinz-Harald Frentzen. The German took over Alesi's role as team leader, but could not add to the points tally. A highlight of Frentzen's brief stint with the team was qualifying 4th at the Belgian Grand Prix.

The team's driver problems were even more acute in the #23 car. Mazzacane was dropped after four races in favour of fellow-South American Luciano Burti, who had himself been dropped by Jaguar. Burti was quicker but also got involved in two enormous accidents which wrote off two chassis. The latter, at the Belgian GP put him out for the rest of the season.  His replacement, Tomáš Enge, performed competently, but destroyed another car at the Japanese GP.

By the end of the season, however, the focus was firmly on Prost's impending collapse. Prost had fallen out with Diniz and his father, and the team was running out of money. A deal with Saudi Arabian prince Al-Waleed bin Talal to become a major shareholder fell through and Prost did not survive into , folding with debts of around $25 million.

Sponsors: Acer (title sponsor/engine),
Ferrari (engine),
Michelin (tyre),
Parmalat (Diniz shareholders),
Panamerican Sports Network,
Adecco,
Magneti Marelli,
CATIA,
Dark Dog

The team eventually finished ninth in the Constructors' Championship, with four points, all scored by Alesi.

Aftermath
The cars and other assets were bought by Charles Nickerson's Phoenix Finance, which attempted to enter a team for 2002 in partnership with Tom Walkinshaw, using the in-house Arrows engines from 1998. Paul Stoddart had also tried to buy the Prost  assets for his Minardi outfit, but was turned down, even though he made a much higher bid than Phoenix.

The new team had Mazzacane and Tarso Marques signed up to drive and arrived for the second round in Malaysia, intending to race. However, they were barred from doing so by the FIA, as they had not bought Prost's entry or paid the mandatory bond for new teams. A bid to overturn the decision in the High Court was rejected and thus ended the Prost team's presence in Formula One.

Complete Formula One results
(key) (results in bold indicate pole position)

* Denotes Ferrari-built engines, badged as Acer

References

External links

Acer Inc.
Prost Formula One cars
2001 Formula One season cars